Gan McGee (born November 20, 1976) is an American mixed martial artist who has competed for the UFC, PRIDE, WEC and the XFC.

Background
McGee was born in Bismarck, North Dakota to Marguerite McGee (nee Ohde) and Curtis Warren McGee. McGee dominated on the wrestling team at Ukiah High School and then continued his career at the University of Iowa and California Polytechnic State University.

Career
McGee debuted with the UFC at UFC 28 on November 17, 2000. He faced fellow debutant Josh Barnett. He lost the fight via TKO in the second round.

McGee returned to the UFC in 2002 after a short stint in WEC where he won two fights.

His return fight was against Pedro Rizzo at UFC 39 on September 27, 2002. He won via TKO after Rizzo was unable to continue past the first round.

His next fight was against Alexandre Dantas at UFC 41 on February 28, 2003. He won via TKO in the first round.

On September 26, 2003, McGee earned a shot at the UFC Heavyweight Championship at UFC 44: Undisputed against 6 ft. 8 in. Tim Sylvia in a match that was dubbed "The Battle of the Giants."  McGee lost this fight via TKO in the first round. After the fight, Tim Sylvia tested positive for steroids during a mandatory post-fight drug test and was stripped of his title.  Even though his opponent was caught using performance-enhancing drugs, the UFC denied McGee a rematch for the championship. As a result, McGee lost his passion for fighting.

"Tim Sylvia is a great fighter and the video tape doesn't lie, he beat the hell out of me," said McGee from his San Luis Obispo training camp. "Did the steroids make a difference? Different people have different theories, I guess. But for me, what hurt the most was sacrificing absolutely everything I had to finally achieve my dream of becoming a world champion, and then falling short. And when it became clear that UFC wasn't going to consider me for a second title shot, my entire world collapsed. I felt like a part of me had just died. It was beyond devastating."

Gan McGee then left UFC and joined the Japan-based PRIDE MMA organization. He lost his two fights with the organization via decision and armbar. But, by his own admission, his heart was no longer in the fight game: "Culturally and personally, being in Japan was an amazing experience," McGee stated. "I mean, from the ceilings to the shower fixtures, everything is so small over there—I felt a little like Godzilla trampling the villagers. But professionally, I never really recovered from the Sylvia fight. Mentally, I lost that edge—that killer instinct. Call it the 'Eye of the Tiger' or whatever you want; I was just going through the motions, unfocused and uncaring. And after losing my second fight in the Orient, I swore to myself that I would never step foot (sic) in a steel cage again—not until I regain my warrior's mentality."

In 2008, McGee now claimed that he regained his long lost passion and embarked on a comeback that he hopes will culminate with the heavyweight world title.  His first comeback fight was at Xtreme Fighting Championships#XFC 5: Return of the Giant on September 13, 2008, at the St. Pete Times Forum in Tampa, Florida. He won via second-round knockout. He said "It took years of introspection and self-discovery, but I finally realized that God made me a giant and blessed me with this mind-blowing power for a reason: to be the most destructive heavyweight champion that's ever walked on planet Earth," McGee stated. "Writers write, teachers teach -- and giants destroy. For so many years I tried to run away from my destiny -- to be something I'm not -- but that part of my life has come to a screeching halt. My intensity level is off the charts right now; if I've gotta tear down buildings, smash open skulls or annihilate whole cities to get another title shot, then that's what I'll do. This time around, 'The Giant' will stand tall."

He lost his last fight at Pure Combat 9 via KO (Punches) in the third round.

Championships and Accomplishments
International Fighting Championship
IFC Warriors Challenge 7 Tournament Winner

Mixed martial arts record 

|-
| Loss
| align=center| 13–5
| Anthony Ruiz
| KO (punches)
| Pure Combat 9
| 
| align=center| 3
| align=center| 1:14 
| Visalia, California, United States
| 
|-
| Win
| align=center|13–4
| Johnathan Ivey
| TKO (punches)
| XFC 5: Return of the Giant
| 
| align=center| 2
| align=center| 0:59
| Tampa, Florida, United States
| 
|-
| Loss
| align=center|12–4
| Semmy Schilt
| Submission (armbar)
| PRIDE Total Elimination 2004
| 
| align=center| 1
| align=center| 5:02
| Saitama, Japan
| 
|-
| Loss
| align=center|12–3 
| Heath Herring
| Decision (split)
| PRIDE 27
| 
| align=center| 3
| align=center| 5:00
| Osaka, Japan
| 
|-
| Loss
| align=center|12–2
| Tim Sylvia
| TKO (punches)
| UFC 44
| 
| align=center| 1
| align=center| 1:54
| Las Vegas, Nevada, United States
| 
|-
| Win
| align=center|12–1
| Alexandre Dantas
| TKO (punches)
| UFC 41
| 
| align=center| 1
| align=center| 4:49
| Atlantic City, New Jersey, United States
| 
|-
| Win
| align=center|11–1
| Pedro Rizzo
| TKO (corner stoppage)
| UFC 39
| 
| align=center| 1
| align=center| 5:00
| Uncasville, Connecticut, United States
| 
|-
| Win
| align=center|10–1
| Ron Faircloth
| TKO (punches)
| WEC 2
| 
| align=center| 1
| align=center| 0:12
| Lemoore, California, United States
| 
|-
| Win
| align=center|9–1
| Seth Petruzelli
| Submission (heel hook)
| WEC 1
| 
| align=center| 1
| align=center| 1:25
| Lemoore, California, United States
| 
|-
| Win
| align=center|8–1
| Rocky Batastini
| TKO (cut)
| IFC WC 12: Warriors Challenge 12
| 
| align=center| 1
| align=center| 3:12
| Friant, California, United States
| 
|-
| Loss
| align=center|7–1
| Josh Barnett
| TKO (punches)
| UFC 28
| 
| align=center| 2
| align=center| 4:34
| Atlantic City, New Jersey, United States
| 
|-
| Win
| align=center|7–0
| Brad Gabriel
| TKO (punches)
| IFC: Battleground 2
| 
| align=center| 1
| align=center| N/A
| Atlantic City, New Jersey, United States
| 
|-
| Win
| align=center|6–0
| Paul Buentello
| TKO (submission to punches)
| IFC WC 7: Warriors Challenge 7
| 
| align=center| 1
| align=center| 2:44
| Fresno, California, United States
| 
|-
| Win
| align=center|5–0
| Tim Lajcik
| TKO (submission to strikes)
| IFC WC 7: Warriors Challenge 7
| 
| align=center| 1
| align=center| 4:38
| Fresno, California, United States
| 
|-
| Win
| align=center|4–0
| Jason Jones
| TKO (punches)
| IFC WC 7: Warriors Challenge 7
| 
| align=center| 1
| align=center| 6:48
| Fresno, California, United States
| 
|-
| Win
| align=center|3–0
| Aaron Brink
| TKO (submission to punches)
| CFF: The Cobra Challenge 1999
| 
| align=center| 1
| align=center| 3:09
| Anza, California, United States
| 
|-
| Win
| align=center|2–0
| Ricky Herro
| align=center|N/A
| IFC WC 5: Warriors Challenge 5
| 
| align=center|N/A
| align=center|N/A
| Fresno, California, United States
| 
|-
| Win
| align=center|1–0
| Sam Adkins
| TKO (punches)
| BRI 4: Bas Rutten Invitational 4
| 
| align=center| 1
| align=center| 4:58
| Littleton, Colorado, United States
|

See also 
 List of male mixed martial artists

References

External links 
 
 

1976 births
American male mixed martial artists
Mixed martial artists from North Dakota
Heavyweight mixed martial artists
Mixed martial artists utilizing collegiate wrestling
Living people
Sportspeople from Bismarck, North Dakota
Ultimate Fighting Championship male fighters